Yurginsky District is an administrative district (raion), one of the nineteen in Kemerovo Oblast, Russia. As a municipal division, it is incorporated as Yurginsky Municipal District. It is located in the northwest of the oblast. Its administrative center is the town of Yurga (which is not administratively a part of the district). Population:  22,779 (2002 Census);

Administrative and municipal status
Within the framework of administrative divisions, Yurginsky District is one of the nineteen in the oblast. The town of Yurga serves as its administrative center, despite being incorporated separately as a town under oblast jurisdiction—an administrative unit with the status equal to that of the districts.

As a municipal division, the district is incorporated as Yurginsky Municipal District. Yurga Town Under Oblast Jurisdiction is incorporated separately from the district as Yurginsky Urban Okrug.

References

Notes

Sources



Districts of Kemerovo Oblast